Queens Public Television (QPTV) is a not-for-profit private corporation Public-access television network serving the residents of the borough of Queens, New York City. QPTV manages the four public, educational, and government access (PEG) channels (Channels 34/1995, 56/1996, 57/1997, 79/1998 on Time Warner Cable; 82, 83, 84, 85 on RCN; and 34, 35, 36, 37 on Verizon Fios) on the cable TV systems for Queens.

QPTV series
Adventures in QPTV Land (2001)
American Vocal Ensemble (1999)
Art a-la-Carte (1989)
The Art of Paper Cutting (1997)
Artists at Work (1992)
Assembly Update (1997) (Network Music's Parade of Flags)
The Beatnik Poets (2001)
Ben's Music and Dance (1997)
Bernie's Place (2006–Present)
Binat Chaim School of Music (1995)
Business Goals 2000 (1996)
Caribbean Classroom
Caribbean Gospel Showcase (1997-1999)
Center Stage
Coaches Roundtable (1997)
Companion Animal Network (1996–Present)
Computer Animation Discussion (1994)
Connection Zone
Conversations (1998)
Creative Insight (1999)
Creative Instincts (1998)
Democracy in Crisis (1996–Present)
De Aqui y De Alla con Natty Abreu
DeVore Dance Center in Concert 1997 (1998)
The E.O.M. Rap Show (2000)
Exploration of the Universe (1997)
Eye Positive (1998)
Eyewitness Ministries's Time With a Band (1998)
Fitness World (1998)
From the Heart (1996)
The Game Show Block Party (2007–present)
Garbage Band 101 (1991)
The Gillis & Barry Show (1996–Present)
A Hidden Feud (1995)
The Hive (1997-1998)
In Our World
An Interview with Joe
Islam, the Universal System (1998-2000)
Ivanka's 1-800 Contest (1998)
James the Magician (1995)
The Jennifer Vanilla Hour (2017–present)
Joan's World
The Joe Show (1999-2000)
Keepin'(g) It Real (1997 and 1998)
Kids (2) (2000-2001)
Kids Will Be Kids (1999)
The Learning Tree Multicultural School (2000)
Life in the Universe (2000)
Lipsynch Party (2) (1997-1999)
The Lou Telano Show (2000)
The Men of Fitness (1997)
Mind Gym (1999)
Mindlight
Mrs. Jellybean (1995)
Music Festival (1998)
Music Movies & More (1998)
Nosotros, Ustedes y... Luz Estella (1998)
Not by Bread Alone
Nueva York: Ciudad de Todos (1997)
O's Crib
The On da Money show
The Panorama of New York City (1998)
Passport to the World (2000-2001)
Pets Alive (1996)
Planet Safari U.S.A. (1996)
Poetry in Gospel (1999)
Pohl Position (1999–Present)
Public Access in Queens (1999)
Queens Music Television (1999)
Quiet Time and Praise the Lord (1997)
Quinteto Brasileiro (1999)
The Realm of Never
Rhythmic Poetry (1999)
Richie's Place
Simple Science
Skate Time (1998)
Social Security & You
Solutions (1998–Present)
Survivor (1997)
Taekwon-Do (1997)
Tete-A-Tete: The Independent Music Scene (1990)
The Typewriter (2000)
Urban Souls Culture
The Way (1994)
What's Happening Berverly?
What Makes The Monkey Dance (2005)
Where We Stand
Women of Fitness (1997)
Words (1997)
You Name That Show (1999–Present)
A Young Artist Sculpts

References 

American public access television
Television stations in New York (state)
Television stations in New York City
Television channels and stations established in 1990
1990 establishments in New York City